Alanic is a sports and fitness clothing brand headquartered in North Hollywood, California, USA. Alanic corporate offices are located at 1/49 Lemana lane, Sydney, Australia. It has been the official supplier of the Miami Marathon USA, Vancouver Sun Run Canada, New Jersey Marathon USA and Some Major Tier 1 Marathons in the United States and also the National Basketball Team of Australia. Alanic has been associated with events like ATP – St. Petersburg Open Tennis; Indianapolis Monumental Marathon 2013, Indiana; 2012 Ironman Triathlon Series in Australia, NZ & Philippines;  Seattle Marathon, USA; Malibu Marathon, USA; where it acted as the official supplier and clothing partner. The Tough Mudder announced a new multi-year partnership with Alanic as the official apparel partner.

See also

List of fitness wear brands

References

External links

Alanic Clothing

Sportswear brands
Companies based in Sydney
Privately held companies of Australia
Privately held companies based in California
Retail companies based in California
Companies based in Los Angeles
Clothing brands of Australia
Clothing companies established in 2005
2005 establishments in Australia
Clothing manufacturers
Clothing companies of the United States